In Greek mythology, Lycomedes , also known as Lycurgus, was the most prominent king of the Dolopians in the island of Scyros near Euboea during the Trojan War.

Family 
Lycomedes was the father of seven daughters including Deidameia, and grandfather of Pyrrhus or Neoptolemus.

Mythology

Death of Theseus
Plutarch says that Lycomedes killed Theseus, who had fled to his island in exile by pushing him off a cliff for he feared that Theseus would dethrone him, as people of the island treated the guest with marked honor. Some related that the cause of this violence was that Lycomedes would not give up the estates which Theseus had in Scyros, or the circumstance that Lycomedes wanted to gain the favour of Menestheus.

Achilles

At the request of Thetis, Lycomedes concealed Achilles in female disguise among his own daughters. At Lycomedes' court Achilles had an affair with Deidamia, which resulted in the birth of Neoptolemus (Pyrrhus). As Odysseus drew Achilles out of his disguise and took him to Troy, Neoptolemus stayed with his grandfather until he too was summoned during the later stages of the war.

Namesake 
The asteroid 9694 Lycomedes is named for him – being a Jupiter Trojan, a group of asteroids which are by convention named for characters associated with the Trojan War.

Notes

References 

 Lucius Mestrius Plutarchus, Lives with an English Translation by Bernadotte Perrin. Cambridge, MA. Harvard University Press. London. William Heinemann Ltd. 1914. 1. Online version at the Perseus Digital Library. Greek text available from the same website.
 Pausanias, Description of Greece with an English Translation by W.H.S. Jones, Litt.D., and H.A. Ormerod, M.A., in 4 Volumes. Cambridge, MA, Harvard University Press; London, William Heinemann Ltd. 1918. . Online version at the Perseus Digital Library
 Pausanias, Graeciae Descriptio. 3 vols. Leipzig, Teubner. 1903.  Greek text available at the Perseus Digital Library.
 Pseudo-Apollodorus, The Library with an English Translation by Sir James George Frazer, F.B.A., F.R.S. in 2 Volumes, Cambridge, MA, Harvard University Press; London, William Heinemann Ltd. 1921. . Online version at the Perseus Digital Library. Greek text available from the same website.

External links
 

Kings in Greek mythology
Characters in the Iliad
Skyros
Theseus